Rockland St Peter is a village and former civil parish, now in the parish of Rocklands, in the Breckland district, in the county of Norfolk, England. Its church is one of 124 existing round-tower churches in Norfolk. In 1931 the parish had a population of 286.

History 
The villages name means 'rook grove', the "St Peter" part from the dedication of the church. On 1 April 1935 the parish was abolished to form Rocklands.

References

External links

St Peter's on the European Round Tower Churches website
 Village website 

Villages in Norfolk
Former civil parishes in Norfolk
Breckland District